William Henry Clegg (born 1867 - died 1945) was the first Governor of the South African Reserve Bank from 17 December 1920 until 31 December 1931. His successor was Johannes Postmus.

Early life
He was born in 1867 in Stanley, West Yorkshire to father George Clegg.

Career
His banking career started in September 1886 when he joined the Bank of England. By 1895 he was an assistant to the auditor before becoming a first auditor in 1900. In 1914, he was the principal of the branch banks office and by 1919, the banks chief accountant. In 1920, he was selected as the first governor of the South African Reserve Bank a positioned he served until 1931. After then end of his tenure at the South African Reserve Bank, he was appointed as the chairman of the commission of inquiry into the Hong Kong currency. In 1932, he returned to the Bank of England as a director.

Marriage
In 1916, he married Elinor Bowen and had two sons and a daughter.

Death
He died on 16 March 1945 at Stillwood House in Winchester, England.

References

1867 births
1945 deaths
Governors of the South African Reserve Bank
South African businesspeople